Gordon Mitchell Forsyth (1879–1952) was a Scottish ceramic designer and fine artist and art education innovator.

Biography
Born in Fraserburgh, he attended the Gray's School of Art, in Aberdeen and the Royal College of Art. Moving in 1903 to Stoke-on-Trent, he became art director of the tileworks Minton Hollins & Co, where he began a career which "spanned over forty years and left an indelible mark on the ceramic industry of Staffordshire.". In 1906 he moved to take the same position at Pilkington's Tile & Pottery Company near Manchester. He returned to Pilkington's after service in the First World War.  However, in 1920 he became Superintendent of Art Instruction in Stoke-on-Trent, a role which involved responsibility for several art schools.
Forsyth was the tutor of a number of notable students at the Burslem School of Art including Susie Cooper, Glyn Colledge, Clarice Cliff, Charlotte Rhead, Arthur Berry, and Mabel Leigh. At that time, Forsyth was described as a "pottery designer, educator and writer...and one of the main spokespersons on industrial pottery design." And the pivotal role he played in British ceramic design has inspired some to call him "the magus of the mid-twentieth century pottery industry."

Stained glass
Forsyth is best known for his work in ceramics, particularly lustreware.  However, he did work in other media, notably stained glass: he designed stained glass windows for St. Joseph's Roman Catholic church in Burslem in the late 1920s.

Forsyth's daughter Moira (1905–91), who also worked on the decoration of the church, had a successful career as a glass designer.

Published works
 Gordon Mitchell Forsyth, Joseph William Mellor & H. J. Plant, Introduction to Sympsium on Art, Stoke-on-Trent: Webberley, 1921
 Gordon Mitchell Forsyth, Art in the Pottery Industry, no date
 Gordon Mitchell Forsyth, The Art and Craft of the Potter, London: Chapman & Hall, 1934
 Gordon Mitchell Forsyth, M. P. Bisson, F. Jefferson Graham, W. Hartley, Pottery, Clay Modelling, and Plaster Casting, Sir I. Pitman & Sons Ltd. (in two volumes), 1935
 Gordon Mitchell Forsyth, 20th Century Ceramics: an International Survey of the Best Work Produced by Modern Craftsmen, Artists and Manufacturers, The Studio Ltd, 1936

See also
Susie Cooper
Burslem School of Art
Arthur Berry

External links
 Stoke-on-Trent Museums: Gordon Forsyth

 Examples of Gordon Forsyth's works at the Potteries Museum & Art Gallery
 Examples of Gordon Forsyth's works at the Victoria & Albert Museum

References

Scottish ceramicists
Scottish designers
Alumni of Gray's School of Art
Alumni of the Royal College of Art
People from Fraserburgh
Scottish stained glass artists and manufacturers
1952 deaths
1879 births
Catholic decorative artists